Ferdinand Schmutzer (21 May 1870 – 26 October 1928) was an Austrian photographer and engraver.

His works are held in the permanent collections of many museums worldwide, including the National Museum of Western Art, the Freud Museum in London, the Minneapolis Institute of Art, the University of Michigan Museum of Art, the Detroit Institute of Arts, the Fine Arts Museums of San Francisco, the Blanton Museum of Art, the Glasgow Museums Resource Centre, the Brooklyn Museum, the Neue Galerie Graz, the Ackland Art Museum, the Seattle Art Museum, the McClung Museum of Natural History & Culture, and the British Museum.

References

External links 

Austrian photographers
Austrian engravers
1870 births
1928 deaths
19th-century engravers
20th-century engravers
Photographers from Vienna
Burials at Döbling Cemetery